H. Lenn Keller (September 29, 1951 – December 16, 2020), born Helen Lenora Keller, was an American photographer and filmmaker based in San Francisco, founder of the Bay Area Lesbian Archives.

Early life 
Keller was born in Evanston, Illinois in 1951 (some sources give 1950 as the year), the daughter of a World War II veteran. Her birth name was intended as a reference to the well-known Helen Keller, an association Keller found difficult at times. She graduated from New Trier High School in suburban Winnetka, where she was one of the few black students in her classes; she later recalled that "racism saved me from compulsory heterosexuality". She moved to New York City in 1968, and to San Francisco in 1975. In 1984, she earned a bachelor's degree in visual communication at Mills College.

Career 
Keller was a photographer and filmmaker documenting diverse queer cultures in San Francisco. Her first short film, Ifé (1993), won an audience award at the 1994 Women's International Film Festival in Madrid.  A second short film, Sightiings (1995), was a romantic comedy with black lesbian lead characters. She appears in the documentary Gender Troubles: The Butches (2016).

Exhibitions of Keller's work included Gender Warriors, and Fierce Sistahs! (2010, San Francisco Public Library). Her photographs appeared in Aché: A Journal for Black Lesbians, including a self-portrait she contributed for the cover of a 1991 issue. Five of her photographs were included in a major group show, Queer California: Untold Stories (2019), at the Oakland Museum of California. She founded the Bay Area Lesbian Archives in 2014, including her photographs and films, and her collection of community flyers and posters from the 1970s. "This history is very important, not just for posterity, but it’s important for us now," she explained in 2018. She left an unfinished documentary project, Persistent Desire.

Keller was named the Lifetime Achievement Grand Marshal of the 2020 San Francisco Pride event, which was held online because of the coronavirus pandemic.

Personal life 
Lenn Keller had a daughter. Keller died from cancer at her home in Oakland, California in December 2020, aged 69 years.

References

External links 

 Bay Area Lesbian Archives (official website)
 Lenn Keller (official website)
 
 Adrienne Skye Roberts (June 16, 2012). "We Thought the World We Built Would Be Forever: An Interview with Lenn Keller" SFMOMA's Open Space.

1951 births
2020 deaths
People from Evanston, Illinois
People from Oakland, California
American women photographers
Filmmakers from Illinois
Photographers from Illinois
Deaths from cancer in California
21st-century American women